The 2012 Horizon League Men’s Basketball Tournament began on February 28 and ended on March 6. The Horizon League Network broadcast the first and second rounds. The semifinals were televised by ESPNU, with the championship game on ESPN. The Detroit Titans won the tournament and an automatic bid to the 2012 NCAA tournament.

Each first-round game was played on the home court of the higher-seeded team. The second round and semifinals were held at the Athletics-Recreation Center in Valparaiso, Indiana, home to the #1 overall seed Valparaiso. Since Valparaiso advanced to the championship game, the Crusaders also hosted the final.

Seeds
All Horizon League schools play in the tournament.  Teams are seeded by 2011–12 Horizon League season record, with a tiebreaker system to seed teams with identical conference records.  The top 2 teams receive a bye to the semifinals.

Schedule

Bracket

First round games at campus sites of lower-numbered seeds 
Second round and semifinals hosted by Valparaiso 
Championship game hosted by highest remaining seed

Honors

Tournament MVP
Ray McCallum, Jr. of Detroit was named the tournament MVP.

Horizon League All-Tournament Team

References

Tournament
Horizon League men's basketball tournament
Horizon League men's basketball tournament
Horizon League men's basketball tournament
Horizon League men's basketball tournament